The figure and name of Prometheus from classical mythology has appeared in various art and literature.

Cartoons and comics
 Soviet director Aleksandra Snezhko-Blotskaya created two cartoons in which Prometheus appears - The Return from Olympus (Возвращение с Олимпа, 1969) and Prometheus (Прометей, 1974), as part of her 5-film series about the Ancient Greek myths.

Prometheus appears in an episode of Hercules: The Animated Series, where protagonist Hercules takes it upon himself to release Prometheus from his punishment, subsequently defending his decision to his father Zeus by arguing that humanity has proven themselves worthy of Prometheus' gift.

Film and television
 Prometheus appears as a character in an episode of the TV series eighth season of the TV series Supernatural, "Remember the Titans", now suffering from amnesia after an avalanche eight years prior to the episode. Here Prometheus's curse is portrayed as granting him a form of immortality; although no longer chained to the mountain, Prometheus still dies every day in various ways, ranging from being hit by a car to having a heart attack, with his seven-year-old son Oliver having 'inherited' his curse (Seven being the age at which the Greeks believed boys began to become men). Series protagonists Dean and Sam Winchester attempt to help Prometheus break his curse by summoning Zeus- reasoning that mankind owes Prometheus for giving them fire and the ability to stand against the dark- but in the end Prometheus is forced to sacrifice himself to kill Zeus with the aid of Artemis, thus sparing Oliver from having to endure his curse.
 Prometheus is the name of a space exploration ship and the title of a 2012 science-fiction film directed by Ridley Scott. The film's plot also involves an ancient alien race that were involved in the creation of human life. 
 In the science fiction TV series Stargate SG-1, the Prometheus is humankind's first interstellar spacecraft – made possible with technology stolen from the Goa'uld, a parasitic race that enslaves humanity throughout the galaxy by posing as gods.
 The plot of the 2019 horror film The Lighthouse, directed by Robert Eggers, loosely resembles the myth of Prometheus.
 The animated film Promare is heavily based on the story to the point where various characters' names come from Greek terminology, the word 'Promare' coming from Prometheus, its plot revolving around fire, and callbacks to the mythos such as Fennel Volcano. This would later be confirmed by staff in interviews.

Gaming
 In Portal 2, the tale of Prometheus is used by the oracle turret to foreshadow future events in the game. It recounts how Prometheus was cast into the depths of the earth and pecked by birds. Later, the antagonist/anti-hero GLaDOS is cast into the deepest levels of the Aperture Science facility and is pecked by a bird.
 The game BioShock'''s 12th level is called Point Prometheus.
 In the game God of War II, the protagonist Kratos encounters and frees Prometheus from his eternal torment, in turn gaining the power of the Titans.
 In the game Destiny 2, There is a weapon obtainable from exotic engrams in world drops throughout the various maps called Prometheus Lens. A powerful trace rifle added in the Curse of Osiris DLC expansion.
 In Borderlands 3, there is a planet with metropolis-like city called Promethea.
 In the Mass Effect game series, the 'Protheans' are an extinct ancient race that are believed to have built the Citadel and mass relays present in the game's lore and known to have uplifted several younger races.  Their ruins are the original source of all mass effect and FTL technology for the younger races.  Some people believe the species name sounds similar to Prometheus.
 Godfire: Rise of Prometheus is a mobile game in which the player character, Prometheus steals an artifact called the "Spark of Godfire" from Helios with the help of Aphrodite. It features numerous Greek monsters, including the  Minotaur, Cyclops, Lamia, and Scylla. 
 In Persona 2: Eternal Punishment, Prometheus is Baofu's ultimate Persona.
 In Chrono Trigger, Prometheus is Robo's real name, as revealed by Atropos in Geno Dome.

Magazines
 The Eulenspiegel Society began the magazine Prometheus in the early 1970s; it is a decades-long-running magazine exploring issues important to kinksters, ranging from art and erotica, to advice columns and personal ads, to conversation about the philosophy of consensual kink. The magazine now exists online.

Music
 The Norwegian symphonic black metal band Emperor released, in 2001, an album entitled "Prometheus: The Discipline of Fire & Demise".
 The American Metalcore band Trivium pointed out similarities of the crucifixion of Jesus Christ, and Prometheus' torment of being eternally tortured in their song "Of Prometheus and The Crucifix".
 The American a mobile game inspired by the myth of Prometheus punk band The Menzingers mention Prometheus in their song "Sir Yes Sir".

Novels/Short stories
 Prometheus appears in The Last Olympian by Rick Riordan, where he is a diplomat of the antagonistic Titan Army.
 "Frankenstein; or, The Modern Prometheus" is the title of the 1818 novel written by Mary Shelley.
 The spaceship in Arthur C. Clarke's Summertime on Icarus is called 'Prometheus'

Paintings

Sculptures

Science

The myth of Prometheus, with its theme of invention and discovery, has been used in science-related names and as a metaphor for scientific progress.
 The cloned horse Prometea, and Prometheus, a moon of Saturn, are named after this Titan, as is the asteroid 1809 Prometheus.
 The name of the sixty-first element, promethium, is derived from Prometheus.
 The Prometheus Society is a High IQ society. The name of its magazine, Gift of Fire, is explained by the ancient association of fire with mental gifts.
 Prometheus Books, a publishing company for scientific, educational, and popular books, especially those relating to secular humanism or scientific skepticism, takes its name from the myth.
 The Prometheus Award is given by the Libertarian Futurist Society for Libertarian science fiction.
 In 1983 Robert Anton Wilson published a non-fiction book called Prometheus Rising (which was followed by Quantum Psychology)
 Scientific and medical literature about liver regeneration often alludes to Prometheus and the devouring and daily regrowth of his liver. Some think the myth even indicates that the ancient Greeks knew about the liver’s remarkable capacity for self-repair. The Greek word for liver, hēpar, hepat- (cf. English "hepatitis", "hepatology", etc.) is derived from the verb hēpaomai'', meaning "mend, repair". While others doubt the significance to Greek medical knowledge, Prometheus's name is associated with biomedical companies involved in regenerative medicine.

Military
A Russian air defense system called S-500 missile system is named after Prometheus

See also 
 Olympic flame
 Prometheism, a political project in Poland named for Prometheus.

References

External links
 Prometheus a sci-fi movie of Zoltan Deme
 The Post Modern Prometheus a short story by Phillip Donnelly

Classical mythology in popular culture